Dianella nigra, (turutu in Māori, New Zealand blueberry or ink berry) is a perennial herb of the family Asphodelaceae, subfamily Hemerocallidoideae, found in New Zealand. The bright blue berries are attractive to birds, but they are very bitter and are not considered edible by humans, and may be poisonous if eaten in large amounts.

References

nigra
Flora of New Zealand